Antonio Tavaras Chatman (born February 12, 1979) is a former American football wide receiver and punt returner. He was signed by the San Francisco 49ers as an undrafted free agent in 2002. He played college football at Cincinnati.

Chatman also played for the Chicago Rush, Green Bay Packers and Cincinnati Bengals.

College career
Chatman was born in Jackson, Alabama and attended the Susan Miller Dorsey High School in Los Angeles, California. He attended El Camino College and the University of Cincinnati where he was a Criminology major.

Professional career

San Francisco 49ers
Chatman signed as an undrafted free agent with the San Francisco 49ers of the NFL but was soon released.

Chicago Rush
He then joined the Chicago Rush of the AFL in 2002.  After two weeks on the bench behind offensive specialist Joe Douglass, a freak season-ending injury to Douglass during pre-game warmups pushed Chatman into the starting job in Week 3, and he responded with a strong rookie season, leading the Rush in receiving with 74 catches for 1,068 yards and 23 touchdowns, and earning AFL All-Rookie Team honors in the process.  He followed that campaign with an even better season in 2003, catching 123 passes for 1,636 yards and 29 touchdowns, and added 2,062 yards and 7 touchdowns on kick returns to set an AFL record for all-purpose yardage.  Chatman was named to the All-Arena Second-team and was a runner-up for the league's Offensive Player of the Year award.

Green Bay Packers
His success in Chicago attracted the attention of the NFL's Green Bay Packers, and he signed with that team for the 2003 season.

Upon joining the Green Bay Packers, Chatman was largely relegated to a kick returning role, seeing only sparing action as a wide receiver his first season.  In 2004, he gradually saw an increased role in the offense at receiver, before finally seeing extensive action as a starter in 2005 due to injuries to Javon Walker and Robert Ferguson. In his second to last game with the Packers, Chatman returned a punt 85 yards for a touchdown. It was the first punt returned for touchdown for the Packers since Allen Rossum did it in 2001.

Cincinnati Bengals
Chatman signed with the Cincinnati Bengals prior to the 2006 NFL Season. However, in 2006 he missed several of the Bengals early games due to injury, and eventually was put on injured reserve.
On September 7, 2007 the Bengals cut him but re-signed him a few days later for the 2007 season. On February 26, 2008, the Bengals reached a new two-year agreement with Chatman. On November 16, 2008, Chatman suffered a cervical injury in a game against the Philadelphia Eagles.

Chatman was released on November 17, 2009, with an injury settlement after being placed on injured reserve earlier in the year.

Sacramento Mountain Lions
Chatman was selected with the third pick of the sixth round and 28th selection overall in the 2010 UFL Draft by the Sacramento Mountain Lions on June 4, 2010 where he will be re-united with former Cincinnati Bengals teammate Chris Perry and Doug Gabriel.

NFL career statistics

Regular season

Personal
Chatman is married to his wife Minisha; the couple has two children, Deyja and Keyonn.

References

External links
Just Sports Stats
Arena football stats
Cincinnati Bengals bio
databaseFootball.com
Pro-Football-Reference.Com

1979 births
Living people
People from Jackson, Alabama
Players of American football from Alabama
American football wide receivers
American football return specialists
Susan Miller Dorsey High School alumni
Cincinnati Bearcats football players
San Francisco 49ers players
Chicago Rush players
Green Bay Packers players
Cincinnati Bengals players
Sacramento Mountain Lions players